Ike is an unincorporated community in Ellis County, Texas, United States. The community is served by Farm to Market Road 878. The nearest city to Ike is Waxahachie.

References

External links
 Ike, TX at Handbook of Texas Online

Unincorporated communities in Ellis County, Texas
Unincorporated communities in Texas
Dallas–Fort Worth metroplex